Yengiabad may refer to:
 Yengiabad-e Chai, East Azerbaijan
 Yengiabad, Kurdistan
 Yengiabad, West Azerbaijan
 Yengiabad, Zanjan